Epiphora is a genus of large moths in the family Saturniidae. The genus was first described by Wallengren in 1860. They are native to Sub-Saharan Africa.

Epiphora mythimnia (Westwood, 1849)

Species
Epiphora aequatorialis (Testout, 1935)
Epiphora albida (Druce, 1886)
Epiphora antinorii (Oberthuer, 1880)
Epiphora atbarina (Butler, 1877)
Epiphora bauhiniae (Guerin-Meneville, 1829)
Epiphora bedoci (Bouvier, 1929)
Epiphora berliozi (Rougeot, 1948)
Epiphora boolana (Strand, 1909)
Epiphora boursini Testout, 1935
Epiphora bouvieri Testout, 1935
Epiphora brunnea (Bouvier, 1930)
Epiphora cadioui Bouyer, 2008
Epiphora congolana (Bouvier, 1929)
Epiphora conjuncta (Bouvier, 1930)
Epiphora cordieri (Bouvier, 1928)
Epiphora cotei (Testout, 1935)
Epiphora damarensis Schultze, 1913
Epiphora elianae Rougeot, 1974
Epiphora feae Aurivillius, 1910
Epiphora fournierae (Le Moult, 1945)
Epiphora gabonensis (Testout, 1935)
Epiphora hassoni Bouyer, 2008
Epiphora imperator (Stoneham, 1933)
Epiphora intermedia (Rougeot, 1955)
Epiphora kipengerensis Darge, 2007
Epiphora lecerfi (Testout, 1935)
Epiphora liberiensis (Bouvier, 1928)
Epiphora lugardi Kirby, 1894
Epiphora macedoi Darge, Mendes & Bivar de Sousa, 2006
Epiphora macrops Bouvier, 1929
Epiphora magdalena Gruenberg, 1909
Epiphora manowensis (Gschwandner, 1923)
Epiphora marginimacula Joicey & Talbot, 1924
Epiphora mineti Darge, 1994
Epiphora miriakamba Darge, 2007
Epiphora modesta (Bouvier, 1936)
Epiphora murphyi Bouyer, 2008
Epiphora mythimnia (Westwood, 1849)
Epiphora newporti Bouyer, 2007
Epiphora niepelti (Gschwandner, 1925)
Epiphora nubilosa (Testout, 1938)
Epiphora oberprieleri Bouyer, 2008
Epiphora obscura Dufrane, 1953
Epiphora pelosoma (W. Rothschild, 1907)
Epiphora perspicua (Butler, 1878)
Epiphora ploetzi (Weymer, 1880)
Epiphora pygmaea (Bouvier, 1929)
Epiphora rectifascia W. Rothschild, 1907
Epiphora rotunda Naumann, 2006
Epiphora rufa (Bouvier, 1929)
Epiphora schultzei Aurivillius, 1905
Epiphora styrax Darge, 1994
Epiphora testenoirei (Bouvier, 1929)
Epiphora testouti (Rougeot, 1948)
Epiphora torquata (Bouvier, 1929)
Epiphora vacuna (Westwood, 1849)
Epiphora vacunoides (Testout, 1948)
Epiphora victoria (Maassen & Weyding, 1885)
Epiphora werneri Darge, 2007
Epiphora weymeri Druce

References

External links

Saturniinae